In enzymology, an arginine N-succinyltransferase is an enzyme that catalyzes the chemical reaction

succinyl-CoA + L-arginine  CoA + N2-succinyl-L-arginine

Thus, the two substrates of this enzyme are succinyl-CoA and L-arginine, whereas its two products are CoA and N2-succinyl-L-arginine.

This enzyme belongs to the family of transferases, specifically those acyltransferases transferring groups other than aminoacyl groups.  The systematic name of this enzyme class is succinyl-CoA:L-arginine N2-succinyltransferase. Other names in common use include arginine succinyltransferase, AstA, arginine and ornithine N2-succinyltransferase, AOST, AST, and succinyl-CoA:L-arginine 2-N-succinyltransferase.  This enzyme participates in arginine and proline metabolism.

Structural studies

As of late 2007, only one structure has been solved for this class of enzymes, with the PDB accession code .

References

Further reading

 
 
 
 
 
 
 

EC 2.3.1
Enzymes of known structure